Carpenter is a city in Mitchell County, Iowa, United States. The population was 87 at the 2020 census.

Geography
Carpenter is located at  (43.415506, -93.017160).

Demographics

2010 census
As of the census of 2010, there were 109 people, 47 households, and 27 families living in the city. The racial makeup of the city was 98.2% White and 1.8% African American.

There were 47 households, of which 29.8% had children under the age of 18 living with them, 51.1% were married couples living together, 6.4% had a female householder with no husband present, and 42.6% were non-families. 38.3% of all households were made up of individuals, and 14.9% had someone living alone who was 65 years of age or older. The average household size was 2.32 and the average family size was 3.15.

The median age in the city was 40.8 years. 26.6% of residents were under the age of 18; 8.3% were between the ages of 18 and 24; 20.2% were from 25 to 44; 28.4% were from 45 to 64; and 16.5% were 65 years of age or older. The gender makeup of the city was 51.4% male and 48.6% female.

2000 census
As of the census of 2000, there were 130 people, 50 households, and 30 families living in the city. The racial makeup of the city was 100.00% White.

There were 50 households, out of which 40.0% had children under the age of 18 living with them, 46.0% were married couples living together, 8.0% had a female householder with no husband present, and 40.0% were non-families. 34.0% of all households were made up of individuals, and 10.0% had someone living alone who was 65 years of age or older. The average household size was 2.60 and the average family size was 3.43.

In the city, the population was spread out, with 36.9% under the age of 18, 6.9% from 18 to 24, 28.5% from 25 to 44, 14.6% from 45 to 64, and 13.1% who were 65 years of age or older. The median age was 31 years. For every 100 females, there were 91.2 males. For every 100 females age 18 and over, there were 90.7 males.

The median income for a household in the city was $27,500, and the median income for a family was $34,167. Males had a median income of $28,333 versus $22,500 for females. The per capita income for the city was $14,864. There were 10.0% of families and 5.3% of the population living below the poverty line, including no under eighteens and 20.0% of those over 64.

Attractions

Carpenter is known for hosting summer softball league play at its two lighted ballfields, part of the Carpenter Community Center. The Community Center is the former gymnasium of Carpenter's high school, which consolidated with St. Ansgar schools in the 1960s. The gymnasium is frequently rented out for private events, dances and weddings.

Businesses in town as of 2006 included Dockum TV and Appliance, Viafield, Carpenter Location, Tiny's Livestock, and Carpenter Bar and Grill. Carpenter Bar and Grill, formerly known as RJ's, was a popular hangout which drew clientele from a wide radius before it was totally destroyed by fire early in the morning hours of June 19, 2006.   The business was rebuilt in the same location, and reopened in 2008.

Notable person
"Top Chef" contestant Carrie Mashaney grew up in Carpenter.

References

Cities in Iowa
Cities in Mitchell County, Iowa